The 2003 Australian Drivers' Championship was a CAMS sanctioned national motor racing title for drivers of cars conforming to Formula 4000 regulations. The title was contested over a six-round, twelve race series which was promoted as the 2003 Holden Australian Drivers' Championship for the CAMS Gold Star. It was the 47th Australian Drivers' Championship.

New Zealander Daniel Gaunt won the championship driving three different Reynards for two different teams over the course of the season. Gaunt only won two of the twelve races but achieved a race finishing consistency his rivals lacked and finished eight points ahead of his nearest rivals. Second place was tied between Jonny Reid and Paul Trengove, both driving Reynards.

Apart from the seven wins claimed by Gaunt and Reid, three wins were taken by another New Zealander, Nelson Hartley (Reynard 94D & Reynard 97D), and two wins by Ricky Occhipinti (Reynard 97D and 98D).

Race calendar
The 2003 Australian Drivers' Championship was contested over a six-round series with two races per round.

Points system
Championship points were awarded on a 20–15–12–10–8–6–4–3–2–1 basis for the first ten positions in each race.

The round winner for each round was determined by the aggregation of championship points awarded in that round. Where more than one driver had been awarded equal points, the round result was determined by the placings in Race 2.

Results

Note: All cars were required to be fitted with a 3.8-litre Holden V6 engine.

Silver Star

Note: Approved competitors were awarded points towards a Silver Star Trophy based on their finishing positions in each race relative to other such nominated competitors. These points had no reflection on the Australian Drivers' Championship classification.

Yokohama Rookie of the Year Award
The Yokohama Rookie of the Year Award was won by Daniel Gaunt. The award was open to drivers who had contested less than two races for the Australian Drivers' Championship since 1989.

References

Australian Drivers' Championship
Drivers' Championship
Formula Holden
Australian Drivers